Basecamp Valley is a small ice-filled valley at the west side of Avalanche Ridge, in the Jones Mountains of Antarctica. It was mapped and named by the University of Minnesota Jones Mountains Party, 1960–61, who established a base camp, "Camp Minnesota," just north of the mouth of this valley.

References
 

Valleys of Antarctica
Landforms of Ellsworth Land